Regional File was a Canadian documentary television miniseries which aired on CBC Television in 1975.

Premise
Documentaries produced in various Canadian regions were featured in this miniseries.

Scheduling
This half-hour series was broadcast Thursdays at 10:30 p.m. from 5 June to 10 July 1975.

Episodes
 "Northwest Quarter" (Mike Halleran producer), from British Columbia, on industry development in the province's northwest
 "What's All The Fuss About?", from Ottawa, concerning substance abuse
 "Sex And Sixteen" (Ian Parker producer), from Toronto, regarding youth and sexuality
 "The Other Side Of The River" (Ian Wiseman producer), from St. John's, concerning the divided Labrador community of North West River
 "Truth And Consequences", from CBC Toronto's The Rogers Report, about lie detection technology
 "Suicide", (Norm Bortnick producer), from Winnipeg

References

External links
 

CBC Television original programming
1975 Canadian television series debuts
1975 Canadian television series endings